"Judge Not" is Bob Marley's first recorded single, recorded at Federal Studios released on Leslie Kong's Beverley's Records in Jamaica in 1962 and on Island Records in the UK the following year. With a ska beat, Marley has a youthful voice, as it was his first recorded song. Headley Bennett performed saxophone on this recording. Though "Judge Not" failed to achieve much success, Marley was not discouraged and continued to record music. "Judge Not" was re-released in the Songs of Freedom album in 1992 as well as other compilations. The song was also covered by Sublime, and can be found on the box set Everything Under the Sun.

The song is about morality, and may have been based on the Biblical quote "Judge not lest ye be judged". Some of the song lyrics are paraphrased in the background vocals of the later Marley hit "Could You Be Loved".

References

Bob Marley songs
1962 songs
Songs written by Bob Marley
1962 debut singles
Song recordings produced by Leslie Kong
Songs based on the Bible